Gurk is an Austrian market town and former episcopal see in the District of Sankt Veit an der Glan, Carinthia.

Geography 
The community of Gurk is surrounded by alpine meadows and vast high forests. It marks the center of the sparsely populated Gurk Valley. Downstream on the Gurk, lies the small town of Straßburg, from whose fortress the Prince-Bishops of Gurk reigned.

Subdivisions 
Towns: Pisweg, Gruska, Gurk

Communities: Dörfl, Finsterdorf, Föbing, Gassarest, Glanz, Gruska, Gurk, Gwadnitz, Hundsdorf, Kreuzberg, Krön, Masternitzen, Niederdorf, Pisweg, Ranitz, Reichenhaus, Straßa, Sutsch, Zabersdorf, Zedl, Zedroß, Zeltschach

Neighboring municipalities 
 Straßburg
 Weitensfeld im Gurktal
 Mölbling 
 Frauenstein

History 

The name Gurk ("die Gurgelnde" or "the Gurgling one") comes from the river of the same name. The area was settled around 2000 years ago, but it only achieved any importance after Carinthia was incorporated by Bavaria.

After the death of her husband and her sons, Saint Hemma of Gurk founded a religious house on the market place of what is now Gurk. However, Gurk Abbey did not have a long existence: its site was used in 1072 for the cathedral and bishop's palace of the newly founded diocese of Gurk by the Archbishop of Salzburg, whose seat was in the northern part of Carinthia. Gurk was the bishop's seat until 1787; his residence is now located in Klagenfurt.

On June 25, 1988, Pope John Paul II visited the cathedral and prayed in the crypt at the grave of Saint Hemma. The first papal visit in the history of Carinthia was a big media event and brought a thousand men to an open-air mass in front of the cathedral.

Gurk was named a "European Municipality" by the Council of Europe in 1998.

Ecclesiastical history 
See Roman Catholic Diocese of Gurk

Main sights 
 Gurk Cathedral

Politics 
The municipal council - elections of 2003 - consists of
 FPÖ: 7 seats
 SPÖ: 4 seats
 ÖVP: 4 seats.
The directly elected mayor is Siegfried Kampl (BZÖ), also MP of the Federal Council of Austria.

People 
 Saint Hemma of Gurk

Sources and references 

 this article is partially based on a translation of its German equivalent.

External links 

  Entry at aeiou.at

Cities and towns in Sankt Veit an der Glan District